A comprehensive but not complete list of artworks at the Minnesota State Capitol.

List of Removed Artwork

See also
Minnesota State Capitol
Minnesota State Capitol artwork

References 

Artwork
Minnesota State Capitol
Minnesota-related lists